Bebbuli is a 1980 Telugu-language drama film directed by V. Madhusudhana Rao and produced by Vadde Sobhanadri. The film stars Krishnam Raju and Sujatha in the lead roles. The film had music by J. V. Raghavulu.

Cast
Krishnam Raju
Sujatha
Prabhakar Reddy
Jaggayya
Jyothi Lakshmi

References

External links

1980 films
Indian drama films
Films directed by V. Madhusudhana Rao
Films scored by J. V. Raghavulu
1980s Telugu-language films